Relentless is a 1948 American Western film directed by George Sherman and starring Robert Young and Marguerite Chapman in the main roles.

The film was based on the 1937 novel Three Were Thoroughbreds by Kenneth Taylor Perkins which was also used for the 1953 Audie Murphy film Tumbleweed.

Plot
Framed for a murder he didn't commit, a cowboy must stay one step ahead of the law as he hunts for the real killer.

Cast
 Robert Young as Nick Buckley
 Marguerite Chapman as Luella Purdy
 Willard Parker as Sheriff Jeff Moyer
 Akim Tamiroff as Joe Faringo
 Barton MacLane as Tex Brandaw
 Mike Mazurki as Jake
 Robert Barrat as Ed Simpson
 Clem Bevans as Dad

Release
The film was released in the United States on February 20, 1948. In the United Kingdom, it started on November 1, 1948.

Box Office
It grossed $1.6 million in North American rentals.

References

External links
 

1948 Western (genre) films
1948 films
American Western (genre) films
Columbia Pictures films
Films based on American novels
Films based on Western (genre) novels
Films directed by George Sherman
1940s American films